The Swedish Södermanland class of diesel-electric submarines consists of  and . These two submarines were originally launched as s in 1987 and 1990, and have been relaunched as a new class after extensive modernization in 2003 and 2004 by Kockums AB. It contains two Stirling engines which are coupled to electric generators and heated by burning diesel fuel with liquid oxygen stored in cryogenic tanks. The AIP system can provide electric energy to extend the submarine's submerged time from days to weeks.

, the class was planned to remain in service until 2019-20 when it was to be replaced by the future s.  

Units

References

External links
Kockums page about the Södermanland class
Kockums AIP Stirling system

Submarines of the Swedish Navy
Submarine classes
Naval ships of Sweden